Edicions Bromera is a valencian publishing house founded in Alzira in 1986. It offers in its catalogue over 3,000 titles distributed in the catalan language in 30 different collections, a selection of the very best of literature for children, young adults and adults, with broad, open-minded and plural criteria. Grup Bromera is set up by different imprints as Bromera, algar Editorial, animallibres, Més Llibres or tàndem Edicions.

References 

Publishing companies of Spain
Companies based in Valencia